Jattir (Hebrew יַתִּר, pronounced Yattir) is a town in Judea mentioned several times in the Hebrew Bible. It was known as Iethira during the 4th century CE. It is identified with Horvat Yattir/Khirbet Attir, an archeological site in the southern Hebron Hills, located in modern day Israel.

Ancient sources

Hebrew Bible 
Joshua 15:48 says that Jattir was in the mountains of Judah. The village was allocated by Joshua and Elazar to the kohanim of the Aaronic priesthood, according to (Joshua 21:14); Yatir, as written in the Hebrew Bible (Christian Old Testament): "And unto the children of Aaron the priest they gave Hebron with its suburbs, the city of refuge for the manslayer, and Libnah with its suburbs, and Yattir with its suburbs, and Eshtemoa with its suburbs" (Book of Joshua ).

Some 400 years later, the Book of Kings mentions that King David shared a portion of the war booty from his battle with the Amalekites with the elders of Yattir (1 Samuel 30:27).

Onomasticon 
In the early-4th century CE, Greek scholar Eusebius mentioned the town twice in his Onomasticon: “Ietheira is now a very large village in the interior of Daroma, situated near Malaatha", and later, "It is now the very large village of Ietheira, about twenty miles from Eleutheropolis, wholly Christian, in the inner Daroma, near Malatha.”

Madaba Map 
The town is depicted on the seventh-century Madaba Map.

Archeological site
Jattir was identified by Edward Robinson with Khirbet Attir (Horvat Yattir), southwest of Hebron in the West Bank. Félix-Marie Abel noted that there are visible Roman and Byzantine remnants at the site, including a church; moreover, he wrote that the site dominates its surroundings.

A series of excavations was conducted at the site between 1995 and 1999. It appears that the site have been occupied during the Chalcolithic period, the Early Bronze Age, the Iron Age (starting from the 7 century BCE), the Persian period, Hellenistic period, and up until the Mamluk period. Two Byzantine churches were excavated on the site. The settlement appears to have been destroyed at the end of the Bar Kokhba revolt.

Other identifications 
Victor Guérin thought that Jattir was identical with the village of Yater in Lebanon.

See also
Cities in the Book of Joshua

References

Bibliography

 

13 Kohanic cities
Cities of refuge

Ancient Jewish settlements of Judaea
Archaeological sites in Israel